Roman Röösli (born 22 September 1993) is a Swiss rower. He competed in the men's quadruple sculls event at the 2016 Summer Olympics and in the men's double sculls at the 2020 Summer Olympics.

References

External links
 

1993 births
Living people
Swiss male rowers
Olympic rowers of Switzerland
Rowers at the 2016 Summer Olympics
Rowers at the 2020 Summer Olympics
Place of birth missing (living people)
European Rowing Championships medalists
World Rowing Championships medalists for Switzerland